Baltezers is a place name in Latvia that may refer to:

Settlements 

 Baltezers, Ādaži Municipality

Lakes 
 Lake Baltezers, Brocēni Municipality
 Lake Baltezers, Ilūkste Municipality
 Lake Baltezers, Krustpils Municipality
 Lake Baltezers, Nereta Municipality
 Lake Baltezers, Smiltene Municipality
 Lake Baltezers, Vecumnieki Municipality
 Lake Lielais Baltezers
 Lake Mazais Baltezers

Other uses 
 , on the Riga–Lugaži Railway